During the 2003–04 English football season, Sheffield United competed in the Football League First Division.

Season summary
Sheffield United were unable to repeat the previous season's heroics, finishing 8th in the First Division, a mere two points off the play-off places.

Kit
The kit was manufactured by French company Le Coq Sportif and sponsored by Desun.

Final league table

Players

First-team squad
Squad at end of season

Left club during season

References

Notes

Sheffield United
2003-04